Aleksandra Zelenina (born 21 November 1986) is a retired Moldovan athlete who specialized in the long and triple jump events.

She was born in Bendery. She finished twelfth in the triple jump at the 2005 Summer Universiade. She competed in both long and triple jump at the 2006 European Championships, but failed to qualify for the final round.

Her personal best long jump was 6.51 metres, achieved in June 2005 in Chişinău. In the triple jump she had 13.91 metres, achieved in July 2006 in Minsk.

Competition record

References

1986 births
Living people
Moldovan female triple jumpers
Moldovan long jumpers
Female long jumpers
Competitors at the 2005 Summer Universiade